The enzyme gentisate decarboxylase catalyzes the chemical reaction

2,5-dihydroxybenzoate  hydroquinone + CO2

This enzyme belongs to the family of lyases, specifically the carboxy-lyases, which cleave carbon-carbon bonds.  The systematic name of this enzyme class is 2,5-dihydroxybenzoate carboxy-lyase (hydroquinone-forming). Other names in common use include 2,5-dihydroxybenzoate decarboxylase, and gentisate carboxy-lyase.  This enzyme participates in tyrosine metabolism.

References

 

EC 4.1.1
Enzymes of unknown structure